Adexia is a genus of planthoppers in the family Flatidae. It was first described by Leopold Melichar in 1901.

The species in the genus are:

 Adexia columbica Ossiannilsson, 1940
 Adexia erminia (Fowler, 1900)
 Adexia fowleri Melichar, 1901
 Adexia melanoneura Melichar, 1901

References 

Flatidae
Insects described in 1901